The Varaha Temple at Khajuraho (Devanagri: वराह मंदिर) enshrines a colossal monolithic image of Varaha, the boar incarnation of Lord Vishnu. This temple depicts Varaha as a purely animal form. The temple is located in the Western Group of Temple Complex Khajuraho Group of Monuments, a World Heritage Site inscribed by UNESCO in 1986 in Khajuraho. Khajuraho is a small village in Chattarpur District of Madhya Pradesh, India.

Varaha is the third Avatar of the Lord Vishnu, in the form of a Varaha (Boar).

Legend
Lord Vishnu appeared in the form of a Boar in order to defeat Hiranyaksha, a demon who had taken the Earth (Prithvi) and carried it to the bottom of what is described as the cosmic ocean in the story. The battle between Varaha and Hiranyaksha is believed to have lasted for a thousand years, which the former finally won. Varaha carried the Earth out of the ocean between his tusks and restored it to its place in the universe. Vishnu married Prithvi (Bhudevi) in this avatar.

The Varaha Purana is a Purana in which the form of narration is a recitation by Varaha.

Depiction
Varaha is depicted in art as either purely animal or as being anthropomorphic, having a boar's head on a man's body. In the latter form he has four arms, two of which hold the wheel and conch-shell while the other two hold a mace, sword or lotus or make a gesture (or "mudra") of blessing. The Earth is held between the boar's tusks.

The Varaha Temple structure is one of the monuments among Khajuraho Group of Monuments, a World Heritage Site in India. It is dated to c. 900–925 AD. Inside the temple complex, Varaha Temple is located next (South) to Lakshmi Temple and opposite to Lakshman Temple.

Architecture
The Varaha Shrine, built on a lofty plinth, is simple and modest. It has an oblong pavilion with a pyramidal roof of receding tiers, resting on fourteen plain pillars.  The shrine is built entirely of sandstone.

The statue of Varaha is 2.6 m long and 1.7 high. The sculpture is colossal and monolithic and made of sandstone. The sculpture is carved with numerous figures on its entire body (also seen in image). The sculpture carved between nose and mouth, depicts goddess (of Saraswati) carrying Veena in her arms.

Gallery

References

External links 
 M.P. Tourism Website, Official Website of Madhya Pradesh State Tourism Corporation, Khajuraho
 Archaeological Survey of India, Bhopal Division, Index Page for Khajuraho - Chhatarpur 
 Archaeological Survey of India, Bhopal Division, Varaha Temple, Khajuraho

Bundelkhand
Monuments and memorials in Madhya Pradesh
World Heritage Sites in Madhya Pradesh
Hindu temples in Khajuraho
Varaha temples